Gram Power is an energy technology company founded in 2010 out of University of California Berkeley. The company provides Smart Grid technologies to address the electrification challenges in developing nations. Its founders are Yashraj Khaitan (an Indian), and Jacob Dickinson (an American), engineering graduates of the University of California, Berkeley, who are being mentored by Eric Brewer, a vice-president of infrastructure at Google and a professor at Berkeley. They set up India's first Solar Powered Smart Microgrid in the Rajasthan hamlet of Khareda Lakshmipura in March 2012, providing energy for lights, buttermilk machines, televisions, and fans. Gram Power's core innovation is in their Smart Distribution technology, consisting of their Smart Meters and Grid Monitoring Systems to provide on-demand, theft-proof power with a unique pay-as-you-use schedule that is determined by the end user. The company's operation has been praised by American journalist Thomas Friedman as "the most exciting" energy technology innovation he has seen in India and was selected among the top 10 Cleantech Innovations by NASA in 2011. Gram Power is reportedly "on pace to reach 20,000 homes and have 100 rural telecom towers covered with solar panels for a generation" for 2013.

Microgrid 
Gram Power's microgrid is powered by a centralized array of solar panels which collect the sun's energy and convert it to DC electricity. Surplus solar energy is stored in a battery array, providing users with a continuous supply of energy even during peak usage times and at night, when the solar panels do not provide any electricity. DC electricity from the solar array and batteries is converted to AC electricity via an inverter, which is then distributed throughout the service area via small overhead power lines. The system is monitored wirelessly by Gram Power for energy theft or other usage abnormalities.

Each household is equipped with a prepaid smart meter that draws energy from the microgrid, keeps track of how much prepaid energy the user has remaining, and provides direct feedback to the user about the power consumption of their appliances. A local village entrepreneur purchases bulk energy credit from Gram Power, which is wirelessly transferred to an 'Energy Wallet' that Gram Power provides to each entrepreneur. The entrepreneur then transfers this credit to individual Smart Meters in the village. Once recharged, the meters can be used to operate a variety of household appliances or even higher power water pumps for irrigation.

Gram Power's microgrids can also be integrated with the utility grid. This ensures that the infrastructure is not wasted when the utility grid reaches the village, and in turn makes the utility grid more reliable by adding decentralized generation.

References

External links 
 Gram Power website

Renewable energy companies of India
Information technology companies of India